Egypt Central is an American  alternative metal  band from Memphis, Tennessee.

History

Formation and debut album (2002–2010)
Egypt Central was formed on October 2, 2002. Based in Memphis and named after one of its roads. They wrote and recorded for one year until generating a buzz in their hometown of Memphis, Tennessee. After eight shows, they caught the attention of former Lava Records CEO Jason Flom. Flom offered the band a record deal after seeing their live performances. Egypt Central's self-titled debut album was recorded with producer Josh Abraham in Los Angeles. It experienced many delays, eventually being released by Fat Lady Music on January 15, 2008. Two singles were released to promote the album: "You Make Me Sick" and "Taking You Down". These two tracks also ended up being on the soundtrack of the video game WWE SmackDown vs. Raw 2009. They have performed with bands like Disturbed, Seether, Sevendust, Hurt, Red, In This Moment, and many others.

There is rumored to be an entire second album which never got released due to legal issues with their record label. Two songs meant for this album, "Hate" and "California Dreams" (later reworked as "Citizen Radio" and released on the Murder in the French Quarter: Rare & Unreleased EP), were performed live while on tour in 2008.

White Rabbit (2010–2011)
Egypt Central completed work on their second studio album, entitled White Rabbit, in December 2010 with producer Skidd Mills and released it on May 31, 2011. The album received many positive reviews from many sources. The album's title track was released as the first single on March 1, 2011. The band toured from March–May on the Tour of the American Dream tour with Cold and Kopek. The band toured on their Down the Hole headlining tour with Abused Romance and Candlelight Red in June and with Burn Halo and Red Line Chemistry in July. In addition to several festival appearances, the band toured briefly with Hinder, Saving Abel, and Adelitas Way in August. The band supported Pop Evil on a number of shows in September followed by a supporting leg of shows with Hinder and The Red Jumpsuit Apparatus in October. The band opened for Staind at the Q103 Thanksgiving Hangover, November 26 at the Washington Avenue Armory in Albany New York. They then joined Puddle of Mudd and Pop Evil on December 9 for the 105.7 The X (WIXO) Nutcracker Eleven at the Expo Gardens in Peoria.

Breakup (2012-2019)

On December 3, 2012, after being inactive for a year, bassist Joey Chicago announced through a letter on Facebook that both vocalist John Falls and guitarist Jeff James would not be continuing on with the band, thus bringing an end to Egypt Central.

In 2014 a post was made to the band's Facebook page, announcing a new EP of previously unreleased songs titled Murder in the French Quarter, that was set for release on August 19, 2014.

Reunion & Burn With You (2019-Present)
On April 1, 2019 a mysterious teaser video appeared on the band's Facebook page.  The teaser appears to feature new music along with a cryptic 06 06 19 message.  The video was re-posted on May 6, 2019. On June 6, 2019 Egypt Central released "Raise the Gates" as a new single confirming a reunion. On June 18, 2019, another cryptic teaser appeared on both Facebook and Instagram with a new date 07 05 19.
On July 5, 2019 Egypt Central released "Dead Machine" on their Youtube channel. On April 13, 2020 Egypt Central released a new single "Over Soon" on all platforms.
October 20, 2020, the band announced on their Instagram page the release of a new single "Hunted" set for November 20. Another single, "Let Me Out", was released digitally on April 30, 2021. An EP titled Burn With You was released on July 9, 2021. On December 5th, 2021, the band released a new single, Beautiful Misery with rapper Mikes Dead. On February 22, 2022, the band announced a new single called No Place Like home with a date on their YouTube channel 3-10-22.

Band members

Official members
 Blake Allison - Drums
 Joey "Chicago" Walser - Bass
 John Falls - Lead Vocals

Former members
 Heath Hindman – Lead Guitar 
 Jeff James - Rhythm Guitar
 Don Wray – Lead Guitar (2001–2004)
 Stephen “Worm” Williams – Lead Guitar 
 Chris D'Abaldo – Rhythm Guitar

Discography

Studio albums

Extended plays

Singles

Music videos

See also
 Devour the Day

References

External links
 
 Egypt Central on MySpace
 Egypt Central at Purevolume

American alternative metal musical groups
American post-grunge musical groups
Atlantic Records artists
Musical groups established in 2002
Musical groups from Memphis, Tennessee
2002 establishments in Tennessee